Bruno Courcelle is a French mathematician and computer scientist, best known for Courcelle's theorem in graph theory.

Life
Courcelle earned his Ph.D. in 1976 from the French Institute for Research in Computer Science and Automation, then called IRIA, under the supervision of Maurice Nivat. He then joined the Laboratoire Bordelais de Recherche en Informatique (LaBRI) at the University of Bordeaux 1, where he remained for the rest of his career. He has been a senior member of the Institut Universitaire de France since 2007.

A workshop in honor of  Courcelle's retirement was held in Bordeaux in 2012. Courcelle was the first recipient of the S. Barry Cooper Prize of the Association Computability in Europe in 2020. In 2022, Courcelle was awarded the EATCS-IPEC Nerode Prize.

During the COVID-19 pandemic, Courcelle protested against vaccination mandates in France.

Work
He is known for Courcelle's theorem, which combines second-order logic, the theory of formal languages, and tree decompositions of graphs to show that a wide class of algorithmic problems in graph theory have efficient solutions.

References

External links

Year of birth missing (living people)
Living people
French mathematicians
French computer scientists
Graph theorists